Benjamin Jason Wardlaw Marr (born 23 February 1989) is a Scottish professional footballer who plays as a defender for Darvel.

Career

Celtic and loan spells
Born in Glasgow, Marr began his career with Celtic, but did not make any competitive first team appearances for them. In June 2010, he moved on loan to Falkirk for 6 months before returning to Celtic. Upon his return in January 2011, he was sent out on loan again, this time to Ross County.

Clyde
Marr left Celtic in June 2011, and remained without a club until December 2011, when he signed a short-term deal with Clyde. He played his first game for Clyde on 3 December, against Berwick Rangers at Shielfield Park. On Sunday 8 January 2012, he officially signed a new contract till the end of the season.

Alloa Athletic
On 23 August 2012, Marr signed for Alloa Athletic. After Alloa won promotion to the Scottish Championship, he signed a new one-year contract for the 2013–14 season. After five years with Alloa, Marr was released by the club in May 2017.

Albion Rovers
Marr was not without a club for long, signing for fellow Scottish League One side Albion Rovers on 2 June 2017.

Stirling Albion
In early summer 2018, after being released by Albion Rovers, he was signed by Scottish League Two side Stirling Albion. He made his first appearances for the club in the group stage of the Scottish League Cup.

Darvel Juniors
On 5 July 2019 Marr signed for Junior Side Darvel.

Career statistics

A.  Other includes Scottish Challenge Cup

International
Marr has one Scotland under-21 cap, coming in a friendly against Sweden in August 2010.

References

External links

1989 births
Living people
Footballers from Glasgow
Association football defenders
Scottish footballers
Celtic F.C. players
Falkirk F.C. players
Ross County F.C. players
Clyde F.C. players
Dumbarton F.C. players
Alloa Athletic F.C. players
Albion Rovers F.C. players
Scotland under-21 international footballers
Scottish Football League players
Scottish Professional Football League players
Stirling Albion F.C. players
Scottish Junior Football Association players
Darvel F.C. players
West of Scotland Football League players